Anolis phyllorhinus, the leaf-nosed anole or bat anole, is a species of lizard in the family Dactyloidae. The species is found in Brazil.

References

Anoles
Reptiles described in 1945
Endemic fauna of Brazil
Reptiles of Brazil
Taxa named by George S. Myers
Taxa named by Antenor Leitão de Carvalho